Tonnagh may refer to the following places in Northern Ireland:

Tonnagh Beg
Tonnagh More